Michael Frey (born 1787 in Ladenburg, died August 10, 1832 in Mannheim) was a German violinist, chorus master, and composer.

Frey studied composition with Antonio Salieri in Vienna. From 1823 to 1832 he was conductor of the orchestra of the Mannheim National Theatre. His successor was Joseph Eschborn. He composed a violin concerto and three operas, including the singspiel,  Jery und Bätely, based on a libretto by Johann Wolfgang von Goethe, which was received with applause by music critics.

Sources 
Musikalische Akademie des National-Orchesters Mannheim - Geschichte
Josef Schmidt-Görg: Wiener Opernaufführungen im Winter 1815/1816 Nach den Tagebuchaufzeichnungen eines jungen Geigers

1787 births
1832 deaths
People from Ladenburg
German composers
German classical violinists
Male classical violinists
German conductors (music)
19th-century male musicians